Usaburō Chisaki III (1919–1987) was a Japanese politician. He was a member of the House of Representatives of Japan from Hokkaido. He was the son of Usaburō Chisaki II.

See also
List of people from Hokkaido

Bibliography
日外アソシエーツ『現代政治家人名事典』（紀伊国屋書店、1999年）

1919 births
1987 deaths
Japanese politicians
People from Sapporo
Ritsumeikan University alumni